Udaletxe Plaza or Plaza Consistorial (City Hall Square) is a town square beside Pamplona-Iruña City Hall in the center of the Pamplona-Iruña Old Town in Pamplona-Iruña, Navarre.

It is worldwide known by San Fermin. The square is host to the start of the festival, on 6 July, with the txupinazo and to the end of the festival, on 14 July, with the Gaixoa Ni or Pobre de Mí.

The running of the bulls and the Way of Saint James go through this square.

History
The square has its origins during the Middle Ages. King Charles III of Navarre, with the purpose of ending the constant fights between the three burguak or burgos (Nabarreria, San Zernin and San Nikolas) promoted Batasun Pribilegioa or Privilegio de la Unión in 1423. By this treaty, the three urban jurisdictions became a single municipality, under the same coat of arms and taxes. This order, at the same time, ordered the destruction of the physical boundaries (mainly walls) between the three of them, conserving the outside protections.

Those conflicts are now forgotten. On the field between the three burguak was built Pamplona-Iruña City Hall, which lasts till today. With the building, the square was also built.

Location 
It is located in the confluence between Santo Domingo, Mercaderes, San Zernin, Berria/Nueva, Zapateria and Calceteros streets, at 450 m (1,480 ft).

See also

 Pamplona-Iruña
 Festival of San Fermin

References

Pamplona